Circolo della Vela Sicilia is a yacht club in Mondello, a northern borough of Palermo, Sicily. The club was the "Challenger of Record" for the 36th America's Cup where they were represented by their team, Luna Rossa Challenge.

See also
 Italy at the America's Cup
 Luna Rossa

References

External links
 

Yacht clubs in Italy
Sport in Palermo